Forel (- Trout) was a midget submarine designed by  and built by Krupp in Kiel, Germany. The design was an experimental design built as a private venture by Krupp in hopes of attracting a contract from the Imperial German Navy. Although the design proved moderately successful, the submarine did not attract German naval attention. She was purchased by the Imperial Russian Navy (IRN) in 1904 and served with the IRN until she was lost in a diving accident in 1910. She had the distinction of being the first submarine to have been built in Germany, preceding . Forel was succeeded in service by the Krab class (one ship).

Design
Forelle was a single-hull boat designed with internal ballast and compensating tanks. She had fixed angled aft planes, and movable forward units for dive control. This boat had to be carried into action on board a surface ship and launched close to its target, as she was not fitted with a separate surface propulsion system. She was equipped with two Whitehead torpedoes.

Operational history
The Imperial Russian Navy purchased the submarine in May 1904 for service in the Russo-Japanese War. It was shipped from Kiel to Liepāja by railway, together with a team of German engineers to train the Russian crew, and was commissioned at Kronstadt on 21 August 1904. It was then sent via the Trans-Siberian Railway to Vladivostok, arriving on 29 September, and joined the Siberian Flotilla on 2 October, becoming the first Russian submarine in the Pacific. Although the submarine did not see combat during the Russo-Japanese War, its presence had an important psychological effect.

Forel continued to operate out of Vladivostok after the war; however, by 1908 it was considered obsolete and was re-classed as a training vessel. The submarine sank in an accident on 17 May 1910. Vice Admiral Ivan Grigorovich authorized it to be returned to Liepāja for repairs, but shipping was never implemented.

References

External links

Submarines of the Imperial Russian Navy
Submarines of Germany
Ships built in Kiel
1903 ships
Russo-Japanese War naval ships of Russia
Russian submarine accidents
Shipwrecks of Russia
Shipwrecks in the Pacific Ocean
Maritime incidents in 1910